Miracle Village (officially City of Refuge since 2014) is a community on Muck City Road, about three miles east of Pahokee, Florida, that serves as a haven for registered sex offenders. It is arguably "in the middle of nowhere": rural, surrounded by sugarcane fields, in the most isolated and poorest part of Palm Beach County, "where no tourist ever goes".. The site was chosen because of its isolation; given that, the sex offender residence restrictions do not apply.



Description 
The complex of 54 duplexes and six family homes is operated by Matthew 25 Ministries, an organization with the stated goal of providing prison aftercare. The name is a reference to the passage Matthew 25:36-40 in the Bible: "I was naked and you clothed me, I was sick and you visited me, I was in prison and you came to me...Truly, I say to you, as you did it to one of the least of these my brothers and sisters, you did it to me" (English Standard Version).) According to their website, there is no religious discrimination; non-Christians are just as welcome. The Executive Director in 2017 is Ted Rodarm, himself an ex-offender. The website further notes that they do not accept violent offenders or serial offenders, nor minister to pedophiles, which they define as "someone who can only become sexually aroused by a child". It receives 10–20 applications a week, but only accepts 1 in 20; residents participate in the selection process. In October 2010, the community included 66 registered sex offenders; by July 2013 there were 100; and by 2017 it held 120. The total population, including family members, is 200. It is the largest community of registered sex offenders in the United States. There are an additional 300 who have resided there but since moved on.

An affiliated organization, Miracle Village Ministries, provides services including transportation, to newly released prisoners. It describes itself on its website as "a faith-based prison aftercare ministry". Its office is at 2820 East Main Street in Pahokee. "The community is so popular with sex offenders there is not enough room for them all so they have settled in a nearby town Pahokee with the help of a religious ministry."

History 

Miracle Village has been called "a profoundly Christian place", and "a sanctuary". It was created by the late Richard Witherow, a minister working in prisons for 30 years, who wrote and self-published The Modern Day Leper, attacking the way society treats sex offenders with what he calls punitive, illogical, and counterproductive laws. Witherow, who has since died, and his wife Maggie started Miracle Village in response to Florida's sex offender registration laws, that strictly limit where offenders may live. Witherow, who was a private detective before entering the ministry, previously ran a ranch for sex offenders in rural and isolated Okeechobee County, Florida, that was forced to close because of zoning.

Previously, the complex was known as Pelican Lake. It was built by U.S. Sugar in 1964 as housing for migrants working the sugar cane fields, now replaced by machinery. After working out a deal with Matthew 25 Ministries to lease the property, the owner, Alston Management Inc., informed residents with school-age children that they would have to leave or be evicted.

Federal law prohibits discrimination against families with children, except in certain cases such as communities for the elderly. Witherow was sued by the Legal Aid Society of Palm Beach County and the Florida Equal Justice Center on behalf of some residents. In 2011, a federal judge found that Matthew 25 Ministries and Alston Management had violated the Federal Fair Housing Act.

Relations with Pahokee 
Miracle Village's relations with nearby Pahokee were initially difficult, but have improved considerably. The day Pat Powers, a resident and the village manager, first approached the City Council in nearby Pahokee, "We were the plague. They wanted to hang us. They wanted to knock the crap out of us and they had to give us a police escort to leave."

The mayor in 2009, Wayne Whitaker, stated that he was unaware that offenders were being recruited to live there and that he believed having so many live together would be "very, very risky."

Bond with the First United Methodist Church of Pahokee 
In 2011, Patti Aupperlee, then the new pastor of the local First United Methodist Church, attended a service at the tiny Jacob's Destiny Chapel in Miracle Village and heard Chad Stoffel, a former music teacher, singing. She was spellbound. Since then, he took over as music director of her church and others from the village have joined her congregation; some serve as worship leaders. This has brought new life to an aging church congregation. The congregation also offers a monthly birthday celebration and movie night. Aupperlee, who herself was a victim of sexual abuse, has been quoted as saying, like Witherow, "Our laws [regarding sex offenders] are not rational or even meaningful" and "conditions applied to their release often have little to do with public safety."

Other members of her congregation were hostile at first, but they have since become supportive of the Miracle Village members who attend their church, and this has much helped Miracle Village's relationship with Pahokee. "Initially skeptical residents have come to embrace this often despised population — even champion their shot at a second chance."

In 2017, Aupperlee and Stoffel moved as a team from the Pahokee church to the United Methodist Church of the Palm Beaches, with Aupperlee as Senior Pastor and Stoffel as Praise & Worship Leader.

Media attention

Radio 
National Public Radio's All Things Considered covered the town in 2009.

Photography

Noah Rabinowitz 
On assignment for the German magazine Süddeutsche Zeitung (South German Times), American photographer Noah Rabinowitz took a series of photos of Miracle Village. They were published in 2013, with an article of 4,000 words in the magazine.

Sofía Valiente 
In 2014, photographer Sofía Valiente, who lives in nearby Belle Glade, published a book with the simple title of Miracle Village. The unpaged book contains pictures of Miracle Village and its sex offender residents. Along with an introduction by resident Joseph Steinberg, describing what it is like to be picked up at the prison gate and driven to Miracle Village, the book reproduces 11 handwritten statements by registrants describing their offenses, plus a Dear John letter from an offender's wife saying she wants a divorce. Most of the photos, plus other content not in the book, are available on Valiente's website. Other pictures of the area are posted on Valiente's Instagram account. Of her work, Valiente said: "It is not just a documentary record of a shunned community, but an argument for understanding, rehabilitation, even forgiveness."

Charles Ommanney 
Photographer Charles Ommanney lived at Miracle Village for a week with the residents and in 2017 published 10 photographs, with brief commentary, in Politico magazine.

Movies

Banished 
Banished is a 15-minute video by reporter was Aaron Thomas, produced by Journeyman.tv in 2013 and aired in 2014 by SBS Australia. It concludes with a focus on Pahokee's pastor Patti Auperlee, who has helped the sex offenders be accepted by the wider community.  The video is available on YouTube and a transcript is also available.

Sex Offender Village
A New York Times "Op-Doc" (see Op-Ed) video, May 21, 2013. Focuses on the problems of the residents, many of whom are interviewed. It is available on the newspaper's website.

Second Chance Sex Offenders 
On January 24, 2018, the BBC released its 58-minute documentary Stacey Dooley Investigates: Second Chance Sex Offenders, whose topic is Florida's sex offender policies, the toughest in the nation. Reporter Stacey Dooley interviews some officials who are hostile to sex offenders and believe they can never be rehabilitated, such as Florida Senator Lauren Book and Bradford County Sheriff Gordon Smith; the latter posts red signs in front of the residences of sexual predators (not all offenders). She concludes with Miracle Village, a remote settlement to which sex offenders are in effect banished, the only place where they can get a second chance.

Play

America is Hard To See (Off-Broadway play) 

A research team from the Life Jacket Theater Company visited Pahokee for a week in October, 2015. Based on interviews, autobiographical statements, and court records the team collected, the Company presented America Is Hard to See in January and February, 2018. Author and director is Travis Russ, who is also an Associate Professor of Communications and Media Management at Fordham University. The play is a fusion of personal interviews and texts written by the residents, with traditional Methodist hymns, lines from the sermons of Patti Auperlee, and original songs composed by Priscilla Holbrook. The central theme is whether there are limits to grace, whether or not sex offenders — all of them — can ever be forgiven. "A moving and unflinching play about darkness, uncertainty, and the painful process of healing in small-town America."

When asked how many songs are in the work, Russ responded that there are eighteen "musical moments". Except for the hymns, each line of the songs is taken from the transcript of a statement by a Miracle Village resident, or from a sermon by Pastor Aupperlee.

"America Is Hard To See" is the title of a long poem by Robert Frost.

See also
Julia Tuttle Causeway sex offender colony
Florida Civil Commitment Center
Pervert Park

Further reading

References

External links
 Matthew 25 Ministries web site

Penal system in Florida
Populated places in Palm Beach County, Florida
Sex offender registries in the United States
Sexuality in Florida
Buildings and structures in Palm Beach County, Florida